The Coquí and Coquí 2 (Coquí Dos) campaign involved a sequence of sounding rocket launches in order to study the dynamics of the E- and F-region ionosphere and increase our understanding of layering phenomena, such as sporadic E layers. The studies were supported by the United States' National Aeronautics and Space Administration (NASA) and carried out in 1992 and 1998 respectively.

NASA launched sounding rockets from the Puerto Rican coastal town of Vega Baja, about 20 miles west of San Juan. Among the stated goals were to study how the Earth's ionosphere reacts to naturally occurring phenomena by artificially simulating these phenomena using a high-frequency (HF) radar and study the ionospheric response with both the Arecibo Observatory ionospheric radar and with instruments and chemical tracers carried aboard the sounding rockets. The campaign was named for the coqui frog, which is a small frog in the genus Eleutherodactylus native to Puerto Rico.

References

External links
NASA official fact sheet on Coqui Dos
Resource Center of the Americas: NASA Experiments Continue
  Activists Protest US Navy Radar Project
 Long Spark Running: NASA's Coqui Experiments

NASA programs
Sounding rockets of the United States
1992 in spaceflight
1998 in spaceflight